This is a list of the top-selling albums in New Zealand for 2014 from the Official New Zealand Music Chart's end-of-year chart, compiled by Recorded Music NZ. The chart includes six albums by New Zealand artists, including two albums by brother-sister duo Broods. The chart also includes 13 albums that featured in the New Zealand top 50 albums of 2013. The 2014 chart was the first to include online streaming as well as sales data.

Chart 

Key
 – Album of New Zealand origin

References

External links 
 The Official NZ Music Chart - albums

2014 in New Zealand music
2014 record charts
Albums 2014